Achike Udenwa (born in 1948) was the governor of Imo State in Nigeria. He became governor after winning the election in 1999. Udenwa won re-election in 2003, and his term ended on 29 May 2007.
He is a member of the People's Democratic Party. Udenwa is also an Igbo chief. He was succeeded by Chief Ikedi Ohakim on 29 May 2007. 

In December 2008, President Umaru Yar'Adua appointed him  Minister of Commerce and Industry.
He left office in March 2010 when Acting President Goodluck Jonathan dissolved his cabinet.

References

Living people
1948 births
Igbo politicians
Governors of Imo State
Peoples Democratic Party state governors of Nigeria
Federal ministers of Nigeria